Augustus George Vernon Harcourt FRS (24 December 1834 – 23 August 1919) was an English chemist who spent his career at Oxford University. He was one of the first scientists to do quantitative work in the field of chemical kinetics. His uncle, William Vernon Harcourt (1789–1871), founded the British Association for the Advancement of Science.

Biography 
Harcourt was born in London in 1834 to Admiral Fredrick E. Vernon Harcourt and his wife, Marcia. Harcourt's mother was sister of the first Lord Tollemache. Augustus Harcourt was educated at Harrow School before enrolling at Balliol College, Oxford, where he took a degree in Natural Science in 1858, working with Henry Smith and Benjamin Brodie. A year later Harcourt became Lee's Reader in chemistry and took a position as a senior student at Christ Church, Oxford, where he was a contemporary of Charles Dodgson, better known as Lewis Carroll, and is mentioned in Carroll's diaries. Working with the mathematician William Esson (1838–1916), Harcourt began a series of chemical investigations which lasted for over 40 years.

In 1879, Harcourt sat in the committee which was formed to create an Oxford women's college "in which no distinction will be made between students on the ground of their belonging to different religious denominations." This resulted in the founding of Somerville Hall (later Somerville College).

In 1872, Harcourt married Rachel Mary Bruce, daughter of the Home Secretary, Henry Bruce. The couple had two sons and eight daughters. Harcourt remained at Oxford until he retired in 1902, whereupon he moved to St Clare, near Ryde on the Isle of Wight. He died there in 1919, and his wife followed in 1927.

Chemical kinetics 
In a long partnership, Harcourt and William Esson studied the rates of chemical reactions. Among the processes they investigated was the acid-catalyzed iodine clock reaction (iodide and hydrogen peroxide). Their work showed that the reaction's changing rate was proportional to the concentration of reactants present. This result was later formalised by Guldberg and Waage as the law of mass action. Harcourt and Esson also studied the reaction between oxalic acid and potassium permanganate.

Other scientific work 
Harcourt's other activities included inventing a device to safely administer chloroform as an anesthesic, and the analysis and purification of coal gas, used for illumination. Harcourt also invented pentane-burning lamps that served as photometric standards.

Honours and activities 
 1863: Fellow of the Royal Society
 1865–1873: Secretary of the Chemical Society
 1895: President of the Chemical Society

References

Further reading
  – Harcourt's chloroform regulator.
  – Harcourt's pentane lamp.

External links

 Biographical material from Christ Church (Oxford)
 Obituary from Journal of the Chemical Society, (1920), volume 117, 1626–1648
  

1834 births
1919 deaths
Scientists from London
People educated at Harrow School
Alumni of Balliol College, Oxford
Fellows of Christ Church, Oxford
English physical chemists
Fellows of the Royal Society
Founders of colleges of the University of Oxford
People associated with Somerville College, Oxford